Follow Your Heart is a vegan and vegetarian food company that began in 1970 as a restaurant in Canoga Park, California. In 1977, they began selling Vegenaise, an egg-free mayonnaise substitute whose name is a portmanteau of vegetarian and mayonnaise. The company now also produces other lines of vegan food, such as vegan cheeses, salad dressings, and VeganEgg.

History
The company began as a sandwich counter in the back of a market called Johnny Weissmuller's American Natural Foods in Canoga Park,  In 1994 the restaurant and store suffered serious damage in the Los Angeles earthquake, but remained in business.

Food lines
The company developed a line of its own vegetarian food. One of its first successes was Vegenaise, which became the best-selling vegan mayonnaise replacement in the US, invented by co-founder Bob Goldberg. Up to fifty million gallons of it are produced annually, and the product is also sold in various alternate forms, including soy-free (where the soy is replaced with pea protein powder). They developed a line of deli products, first available commercially in 1988 after a local grocer asked the restaurant to begin packaging its tofu salads for them to put out for sale, focused on plant-based replacements for more traditional non-vegan foods. sliced cheese replacements mirroring the flavors of various types of cheese. Its products are sold in 23 countries, with a turnover of about $50 million in revenues per year.

In 2015, Follow Your Heart was named the company of the year by PETA. That year the company also partnered with musician Lil B to produce an app of Follow Your Heart-inspired emojis; the company's mascot is itself named VegEmoji.

In February 2021, Follow Your Heart was acquired by the European food company, Danone.

References

External links
 

1970 establishments in California
Vegan restaurants in the United States
Veganism in the United States
Vegetarian companies and establishments of the United States